The 1938 Green Bay Packers season was their 20th season overall and their 18th season in the National Football League. The team finished with an 8–3 record in 1938 under head coach Curly Lambeau, earning them a first-place finish in the Western Division. 

In the championship game at the Polo Grounds, the Packers lost to the New York Giants 23–17, the first of only three losses the Packers have in 13 world championship games. The two teams met again in the title game the following year at Wisconsin State Fair Park, with different results.

This season marked the last Packers' win in Buffalo (where they defeated the Chicago Cardinals by two points on a late field goal on a Wednesday night). Since then, they are winless in six attempts against the Buffalo Bills in western New York, the latest on October 30, 2022.

Schedule

^ Played at Buffalo, New York, on Wednesday night

Playoffs

Standings

References

External links
Sportsencyclopedia.com

Green Bay Packers seasons
Green Bay
Green Bay Packers